The 2020 Jacksonville State Gamecocks football team represented Jacksonville State University as a member of the Ohio Valley Conference (OVC) during the 2020–21 NCAA Division I FCS football season. Led by seventh-year head coach John Grass, the Gamecocks compiled an overall record of 10–3, with a mark of 6–1 conference play, winning the OVC title. Jacksonville State received the OVC's automatic bid to the NCAA Division I Football Championship. The Gamecocks defeated Davidson  in the first round before losing to Delaware in the quarterfinals. The team played home games at Burgess–Snow Field at JSU Stadium in Jacksonville, Alabama.

Previous season

The Gamecocks finished the 2019 season 6–6, 3–5 in OVC play to finish in a tie for fifth place.

Schedule

References

Jacksonville State
Jacksonville State Gamecocks football seasons
Ohio Valley Conference football champion seasons
Jacksonville State
Jacksonville State Gamecocks football